Lado Kham was a Slovenian architect and engineer, born on May 26, 1901 in Ljubljana.

He graduated from the Technical University of Vienna and worked as a practitioner in Austria with his mentor, on the construction of municipal apartment blocks in Vienna, including the 420-apartment block in Simmeringerhof. He also led the construction of a Catholic church in the Croatian municipality of Pinkovec/Güttenbach in Germany, and designed the renovation and reconstruction of a monastic church and a new church in Deutsch Schützen, as well as two apartment buildings in the 20th district of Vienna. He participated successfully in various Austrian "concurences" and traveled extensively throughout Europe. As a technical officer at the Pension Fund in Ljubljana, he was involved in the construction of apartment blocks in Ljubljana and Celje.

In 1933, he began his own civil practice and completed numerous smaller private projects in Ljubljana, Celje, Kranj, Kamnik, Bohinj, and other regions of Slovenia, as well as in Koroska, Germany. These included holiday and cultural homes, chapels, tombstones, and the Catholic church in Hrastnik, the renovation of the evangelical church community's prayer room in Ptuj, various smaller church renovations, the renovation and reconstruction of the Kamnik spa, three three-storey houses in Ljubljana, the Hotel Bellevue in Bohinj, the Hotel Sestre Logar in the Logar Valley, the renovation of the Figovec guesthouse in Ljubljana, the renovation and expansion of the Union cinema in Ljubljana, a factory for processing animal fur in Strazisce, the Seraphic College in Ljubljana, a building with commercial premises, a dormitory, cells, a chapel, and a conference hall, as well as a commercial block in Franciskanska street.

Among the unfinished projects are several smaller and medium-sized buildings, as well as several larger multi-storey houses for Ljubljana and elsewhere, including a four-storey apartment building in Belgrade, a municipal hall in Menges, a teachers' holiday home in Omiselj, and projects for various community halls. He also designed a sanatorium for lung diseases on Golnik for the Railway hospital fund.

He held an architectural studio in the Ljubljana Skyscraper building and was involved in its construction.

Notable works 
Architect and researcher Jure Korošec, based in Zürich started an investigation about works of Lado Kham, and below list is a result of his research.

List of works by engineer and architect Lado Kham:
 "School for children with health risks, Amsterdam (practice in the Netherlands)
 New church, Deutsch-Schützen (at the Karl Holey office)
 Catholic church in the Gradiščansko-Hrvatska municipality of Pinkovac (Güttenbach), (construction management at the Karl Holey office)
 Simmeringer Hof, Vienna (at the Karl Holey office)
 "Two residential buildings" in the 20th district of Vienna, Vienna (at the Karl Holey office)
 "Several competitors", Vienna (at the Karl Holey office)
 Pension Fund House, Celje, 1930-1932 (collaborator at the Pension Fund, Vladimir Šubic)
 Inn "pri Rogovilcu", Črnuče, 1929 (reconstruction)
 Pollak - Bonač - Pehani building, Resljeva street, Ljubljana, 1935
 "Three-storey building" on Celovška road, ~1935 (source: Göstl)
 Parish Church of Christ the King, Hrastnik, 1936
 Evangelical Church Prayer Room, Ptuj (reconstruction)
 Kamnik swimming pool Neptun, Kamnik (reconstruction and renovation)
 Hotel "Bellevue", Bohinj, 1935
 Hotel "Sestre Logar" Logarska Valley, -1938
 reconstructing the Figovec Inn, Ljubljana
 reconstructing and equipping the "Union" cinema, Ljubljana
 Animal Fur Processing Factory, Stražišče
 Collegium Seraphicum , Ljubljana, 1937
 Franciscan premises, Ljubljana, 1937
 Relocation of the tower at the Kamnik Fire Department Home, Kamnik, 1934
 Two-storey residential house, Mekinje in Kamnik, 1939
 Bridge over Nevljica, Kamnik, 1935
 Neptune Villa, Kamnik, 1935 (adaptation?)
 Diana Villa, Kamnik, 1935 (adaptation)
 Subdivision of land opposite the train station, Kamnik, 1938
 Deepening Project of the Ljubljana Train Station
 New fairground, Ljubljana, 1939 (competition project; Stanislav Rohrman, Lado Kham)
 Bata Palace, 1940 (addition to usable condition)
 Trade and the residential house of Ivan Lovše, Ljubljana, 1940 (planned, implemented?)
 some other multi-story houses, Ljubljana and elsewhere (planned, implemented?)
 multi-family house, Ljubljana
 two other three-story houses in Ljubljana (underground?)
 4-story residential house in Belgrade (planned, implemented?)
 municipal home in Mengeš, (planned, implemented?)
 Teachers' holiday home in Omišelj, (planned, implemented?)
 Construction of a sanatorium for lung disease, Železniški pavilion, Golnik, 1940 (planned, implemented?)
 Parish Church of St. Martin, Smartno v Tuhinju, Interior Design (Lado Kham, Stane Kregar and Anton Bitenc)
 Ljubljana Maternity Hospital (study, annex)
 Bokalci Health Center, Ljubljana
 Arrangement of cinemas at the Cooperative House, Ajdovščina, 1947 (Head Office for Cooperative Construction)
 Cooperative House, Dolenja vas, 1948 (adaptation, implemented?)
 Leather School, Domžale, 1948 (for the LRS Projective Institute, implemented?)
 Cooperative House, Košani, 1948
 Cooperative House, Godovič, 1952
 Holiday Home of the School Clinic, Kraljevica, 1954 (adaptation and extension, implemented?)
 Agricultural Faculty, Ljubljana, 1947
 Gynaecological and Obstetrical Clinic, Ljubljana, 1963 (adaptation, implemented?)
 City Maternity Hospital, Street of Old Pravda, Ljubljana, 1955
 Hipodrom, Ljubljana, 1951 (sketches, not implemented?)
 Pavilion for Extrapulmonary TBC, Golnik, 1948
 Health Center, Ivančna Gorica, 1958 (adaptation)
 Bokalce Health Center, Ljubljana
 Bežigrad Health Center, 1955 (adaptation)
 Črnuče Health Center, 1959 (District Hygiene Institute, for Lado Kham)
 Moste Health Center, 1957 (Hygiene Station OLO Ljubljana, for Lado Kham)
 Polje-Vevče Health Center, 1956
 Rakovnik Health Center, 1963
 Vič Health Center, 1962 (adaptation; Construction Department, for Lado Kham)
 Logatec Health Center, 1962
 Cooperative House, Orehek, 1948 (adaptation)
 Annex to the cinema hall at the building of the city people's committee, Radovljica, 1950 (draft, implemented?)
 Cultural House, Rakek, 1947 (draft)
 Ribnica Health Center, 1959
 Senožeče Cooperative House, 1948 (draft)
 Šmartno pri Litiji Cooperative House, 1949 (planned, implemented?)
 Sanitary Material Factory, Vir pri Domžalah, 1955 (planned, implemented?)
 Ground Floor Garage Building Rangus-Pečnik, Ljubljana, 1971

References 

TU Wien alumni
Slovenian architects
 20th-century architects